Extensor retinaculum may refer to:

 Extensor retinaculum of the hand
 Superior extensor retinaculum of foot
 Inferior extensor retinaculum of foot